Trafford Bar is a tram stop on Greater Manchester's light rail system, Metrolink, at the junction of Talbot Road and Seymour Grove in Old Trafford. It opened on 15 June 1992 as part of Phase 1 of Metrolink's expansion, before which it was a mainline railway station.

History

The station was opened as Old Trafford on 20 July 1849 by the Manchester, South Junction and Altrincham Railway (MSJ&AR). It closed as a British Rail station on 24 December 1991, and the "Old Trafford" name was transferred to the former Warwick Road Station, to avoid confusion for passengers travelling to Old Trafford Football Ground and Old Trafford Cricket Ground. It was renamed Trafford Bar when it reopened as a Metrolink station on 15 June 1992. Due to the station's close proximity to Old Trafford football ground it is frequently used on match-days by fans using the East Didsbury – Rochdale service.

Service pattern 
At peak times (07:15 – 19:30 Monday to Friday, 09:30 – 18:30 Saturday):

10 trams per hour to Altrincham
10 trams per hour to East Didsbury
5 trams per hour to Bury
5 trams per hour to Manchester Airport
5 trams per hour to Piccadilly
5 trams per hour to Rochdale Town Centre
5 trams per hour to Shaw and Crompton
5 trams per hour to Victoria

Offpeak (all other times during operational hours):

5 trams per hour to Altrincham
5 trams per hour to East Didsbury
5 trams per hour to Manchester Airport
5 trams per hour to Piccadilly
5 trams per hour to Rochdale Town Centre
5 trams per hour to Victoria

Connecting bus routes
It is served nearby by Go North West service 53 to Pendleton via Salford Quays and to Cheetham Hill via the universities, Rusholme, Gorton and Harpurhey.

Stagecoach service 250 to Trafford Centre,
Stagecoach service 255 to Partington via Stretford and Urmston,
Stagecoach service 256 to Flixton via Stretford,
Arriva service 263 to Altrincham Interchange via Stretford and Sale.
All these services run to Piccadilly Gardens.

References

Further reading

External links

Trafford Bar Stop Information
Trafford Bar area map

Tram stops in Trafford
Former Manchester, South Junction and Altrincham Railway stations
Tram stops on the Altrincham to Bury line
Railway stations in Great Britain opened in 1849
Railway stations in Great Britain closed in 1991
Railway stations in Great Britain opened in 1992
Tram stops on the East Didsbury to Rochdale line
Tram stops on the Altrincham to Piccadilly line
1849 establishments in England